Laveraniina is a suborder of parasitic alveolates in the phylum Apicomplexa. The taxon was erected in 1988 by Jacques Euzéby.

References

SAR supergroup suborders
Aconoidasida